Åbogen is a village in Eidskog Municipality in Innlandet county, Norway.

The Åbogen Station is a stop along the Kongsvingerbanen railway line which runs between the Lillestrøm Station in Norway and onwards to the Charlottenberg Station in Sweden. The station and related buildings were designed by architect Georg Andreas Bull. All the buildings date from its opening in 1865 and are of historical value.

References

Eidskog
Villages in Innlandet